Live from a Shark Cage is the first album by Papa M, the third such pseudonym used by David Pajo (after 'M' and 'Aerial M'), released in 1999 on the Chicago-based Drag City label (see 1999 in music).

The album was released on both CD and 180-gram vinyl. As specified in the brief liner notes, "Roadrunner" was recorded in San Francisco by Nat Gleason, "Drunken Spree" was recorded in Chicago by Steve Albini (who produced Pajo's previous band Slint's first album, Tweez), "I Am Not Lonely With Cricket" was recorded in London by Stereolab's Tim Gane, and all other tracks were recorded at Velvetone Music Studio in Louisville, KY, pre-mastered by Konrad Strauss at Chicago Recording Company, and mastered by Nick Webb at Abbey Road Studios.

The image on the mostly black-background cover is a photograph, taken by Valery Yakushev, of a portion of a wall in the Park Of Culture subway station in Moscow.

Track listing
All tracks composed by David Pajo
 "Arundel" – 1:04
 "Roadrunner" – 5:10
 "Pink Holler" – 5:01
 "Plastic Energy Man" – 5:36
 "Drunken Spree" – 9:05
 "Bups" – 1:12
 "Crowd of One" – 3:35
 "I Am Not Lonely with Cricket" – 14:55
 "Knocking the Casket" – 3:32
 "Up North Kids" – 5:14
 "Arundel" – 4:36

Track information
Concerning the songs that bookend the album, a few places share their name with the title of both songs, "Arundel". The town of Arundel in West Sussex, in the south of England, is bordered on the west by the River Arun, and lies within the district of Arun. Both Arundel Castle and Arundel Cathedral lie within the town. Also, there is a county in Maryland, named Anne Arundel. However, considering that Pajo recorded one track in London, it is likely, though by no means definite, that "Arundel" was inspired or influenced by one of the locations in England.

References

David Pajo albums
1999 albums
albums produced by Steve Albini
Drag City (record label) albums